The Burt Rocks are a cluster of rocks at the western margin of Noll Glacier,  south of Axthelm Ridge, in the Wilson Hills. The rocks were mapped by the United States Geological Survey from surveys and from U.S. Navy air photos, 1961–64, and were named by the Advisory Committee on Antarctic Names for DeVere E. Burt, a United States Antarctic Research Program biologist at Hallett Station, 1968–69.

References 

Rock formations of Oates Land